High Rocks is a mountain in Warren County, New Jersey. It is located in the Kittatinny Valley of the Appalachian Mountains.

References 

Mountains of Warren County, New Jersey
Mountains of New Jersey